Coroisânmărtin is a commune in Mureș County, Transylvania, Romania. It is composed of four villages: Coroi (Kóród), Coroisânmărtin, Odrihei (Vámosudvarhely) and Șoimuș (Küküllősolymos).

According to the 2011 census, there were 1,447 living in Coroisânmărtin at the time.  Of this population, 56.05% were ethnic Romanians, 22.94% were ethnic Hungarians, and 15.34% were ethnic Romani.

See also
List of Hungarian exonyms (Mureș County)

References

Communes in Mureș County
Localities in Transylvania